Crawfurd, a variant of Crawford, is a given name and a surname. Notable people with the name include:

Crawfurd Adamson (born 1953), noted figurative artist from Edinburgh
Gibbs Crawfurd Antrobus (1793–1861), British diplomat and politician
Thomas Crawfurd of Cartsburn, 1st Baron of Cartsburn
Archibald Crawfurd (1785–1843), Scottish poet
George Crawfurd (also Crawford) (died 1748), Scottish genealogist and historian
Helen Crawfurd (1877–1954), Scottish suffragette, Rent Strike organiser, Communist activist and politician
Horace Crawfurd (1881–1958), Liberal Party politician in the United Kingdom
John Crawfurd FRS (1783–1868), Scottish physician, colonial administrator and diplomat, and author
John Crawfurd (cricketer) (1878–1939), Irish cricketer
Lionel Crawfurd (1864–1934), the second Suffragan Bishop of Stafford
Oswald John Frederick Crawfurd CMG (1834–1909), English journalist, man of letters and diplomat
Crawfurd Wilfred Griffin Eady GCMG KCB KBE (1890–1962), British Treasury official and diplomat
Captain Thomas Crawfurd of Jordanhill (1530–1603), of Jordanhill, husband of Mary, Queen of Scots